Orthogonius drescheri is a species of ground beetle in the subfamily Orthogoniinae. It was described by Liebke in 1937.

References

drescheri
Beetles described in 1937